Milton-Montford is a neighborhood in the heart of East Baltimore, Maryland. Milton-Montford lies north of Patterson Park and south of Amtrak's Northeast Corridor. The neighborhood is bounded by the neighborhoods of McElderry Park to the south, Madison-Eastend to the east, Biddle Street to the north, and Middle East to the west. The swath of land between Johns Hopkins Hospital and Frank C Bocek Park, which includes Milton-Montford, is often referred to as the "Down the Hill" neighborhood by local residents.

History
The neighborhood lies within the East Monument Historic District. The district is historically significant due to the large Czech-American immigrant community that once lived in the area. Milton-Montford has since transitioned to a majority African-American neighborhood.

Milton-Montford is a neighborhood in transition due to gentrification driven by Johns Hopkins Hospital. Sales of houses have increased since 2016 and prices have soared. Cost of real estate in Milton-Montford neighborhood has increased partly because of the nearby Station East redevelopment.

References

External links

Milton-Montford, Live Baltimore

African-American history in Baltimore
Czech-American culture in Baltimore
 
Neighborhoods in Baltimore
Poverty in Maryland
Working-class culture in Baltimore